The 2019 Wuhan International Tournament was an invitational women's football tournament held in Wuhan, Hubei, China.

Teams
In March 2019, the participants were announced.

Venues

Matches
All times are local (UTC+08:00).

Bracket

Semi-finals

Third-place playoff

Final

Goalscorers

References

External links

Wuhan International Tournament
Wuhan International Tournament
Wuhan International Tournament
Sport in Wuhan